O26 or O-26 may refer to:

 O26 (text editor), used on Control Data Corporation (CDC) operator consoles
 Curtiss O-26, an observation aircraft of the United States Army Air Corps
 , a submarine of the Royal Netherlands Navy
 Lone Pine Airport, in Inyo County, California, United States
 Oxygen-26, an isotope of oxygen